Kalkunte is a village about  from Bangalore in Karnataka, India.

External links
Temple Pictures

Villages in Kolar district